Henequen industry in Yucatán Peninsula is an agribusiness of a plant native to Yucatán, Mexico. After extraction from the plant, henequen is processed as a textile in various forms to obtain a range of products for domestic, commercial, agricultural and industrial use, and as binder twine for crops such as hay. Until the mid-20th century, it was a major industrial activity, the mooring of vessels depending on it. Its decline is attributed to the industry size, its socio-economic impact, as well as the invention of synthetic fibers and the manufacturing from these of substitute products which displaced henequen and sisal fibers. In addition to its fiber, the juice extracted from the henequen plant has been industrialized as a liquor similar to tequila. Also derived from its juice are certain steroidal chemicals used in the pharmaceutical industry.

Etymology
The English term agave was known in the Mayan languages as ki. Henequen (Agave fourcroydes) was referred to as henequen blanco by the Spaniards and sakki by the Mayan, while sisal (Agave sisalana,) was  henequen verde to the Spaniards and yaxqui to the Maya.

Land preparation in the 19th century
Just before the rainy season sets in the vegetation—dry as tinder from the rays of a tropical sun that having beaten down on it for months—is burned off. The drenching rains of the wet season mingle the ashes with the soil, which is all the fertilizing it needs. To each worker are given so many mecates to plant daily. Each mecate then contains from 80 to 100 plants. The holes are not made with a shovel or hoe, but with a stout stick shod with a sharp iron point, and the holes are frequently mere excavations in the soft, friable, limestone rock. The workers work at planting very swiftly, and in a short time a vast extent of territory is planted. During the whole of the first season, and especially toward the close of the rains, the newly planted ground has to be kept clear. This work is done with the machete. In less than three years, the plants are so large that further care is unnecessary, and in from five to seven years they begin to yield. They continue bearing for 20 years. The edges of these leaves are provided with innumerable sharp thorns, sickle or fish-hook shaped, and the point of the leaf is prolonged into a black, very sharp spike or thorn-like.

Production
Henequen is first cut from the stem quite near the ground, then carried to the mill where it is torn into shreds by machinery, and then hung upon rails in the sun to dry, after which it is put up in bales which are compressed by machinery. The whole process is at once simple and effective, and a great quantity may be baled in a single day. Henequen arrives at maturity, or at a point ready for cutting, in five to seven years. Each plant yields 20 to 30 leaves yearly for a period of 12 to 20 years, about a third more in the rainy than in the dry season. It takes over 8,000 leaves to make a 400-pound bale. The bales vary in weight from 350 to 450 pounds each.

The period of 1880 to 1915 are considered to be the henequen boom years. In 1873, 31,000 bales were exported; 1879, 113,000 bales; 1884, 261,000; 1904, 606,000; and in 1915, 1.2 million bales were exported. The production of henequen in 1900 was 500,000 bales; in 1914, the production was 1,026,000 bales; in 1918 the production had declined to 805,000 bales. At the beginning of the 20th century, there were  planted in henequen.

History
In 1898, when the Spanish–American War broke out, the price of fiber advanced rapidly. The supplies of Manila hemp were interrupted on account of the war conditions in the Philippine Islands, and that caused an advance in the price of henequen to about US$0.10 or $0.12 a pound. That sudden advance in the price brought great wealth to Yucatán and it immediately took first rank among the Mexican States. Shortly after 1900, the State of Yucatán showed very rapid strides in education, sanitation, and in the general improvement in the well being of the people. That price, which was high at that time, brought about a boom in Yucatán and the usual consequences of a boom followed, so that there were from 1907 until 1911 a few mild panics brought about by speculation and over-extension not only by the banks but by various commercial firms.
The henequen industry was established on a very solid and profitable basis. The state whose only product, or whose only source of revenue, was henequen, became one of the richest States in the Republic of Mexico. At the time of Salvador Alvarado's entry into Yucatán it was the richest State in the Republic of Mexico. The planters received an average price of about US$0.05 per pound for their fiber. There were various buyers and exporters of henequen in Yucatán up until 1915, when Alvarado drove them out. When Alvarado reached Mérida, he seized the railways of the State. In 1912, shortly after the inauguration of the first military governor, Nicolás Camára Vales, an organization was made of various henequen planters in conjunction with the government of the State. This organization was named the Comision Reguladora del Comercio del Henequen (CRMH), commonly known as the Reguladora. The purpose of that organization was to regulate the henequen industry—that is to say, that when in the operation of the law of supply and demand any large accumulation of henequen took place, the Reguladora was to take this accumulation off the market and hold it until such time as the demand caught up with the supply. The governor of Yucatán was always president ex-officio of the Reguladora. The Reguladora functioned with more or less success but played no important part in the commercial or economic life of Yucatán. When Alvarado assumed power in 1915, he assumed charge of the Reguladora, appointed his own board of directors, and gave notice that he was to arrange that the Reguladora would be the only institution or firm allowed to deal in henequen in Yucatán. Following out this policy, he ordered his director of the railways to refuse to transport any henequen shipped by anybody except to the consignment of the Reguladora.

See also
 List of haciendas of Yucatán

References

Bibliography

Further reading

Agave
History of agriculture in Mexico
History of Yucatán
Economy of Mexico